The following lists events that happened during 1978 in Eswatini.

Incumbents
 Ngwenyama of Swaziland: Sobhuza II
 Prime Minister of Swaziland: Maphevu Dlamini

Events
 October 13 - Monarch Sobhuza II introduces a new constitution.

Date unknown

 The Tinkhundla governance system is established.

Births
 3 March - Bright Nxumalo, international footballer

See also
History of Eswatini

References

 
1970s in Swaziland
Years of the 20th century in Swaziland
Eswatini
Eswatini